The Cerro de las Mitras (Spanish for “Miters' Hill”), is a mountain and a protected area in the Monterrey, San Pedro Garza García, Santa Catarina and García municipalities; state of Nuevo León, México. The mountain is part of the Sierra Madre Oriental, the summit reaches 2,058 MASL, and has 1,303 meters of prominence, the topographic isolation is about 14.48 km. The ridge is about 21 km long stretching east to west. The name comes from the resemblance of the peaks in the ridge with a bishop's mitre.

The Cerro de las Mitras is a popular hiking destination despite its difficulty. Several quarries dedicated to the extraction of limestone to produce concrete operate in the mountain despite its protected area designation.

See also 

 Cerro de la Silla
 Cerro de Chipinque
 Cerro del Topo Chico
 Cerro del Obispado
 Cerro de la Loma Larga
 La Huasteca

References 

Mountains of Mexico
Landmarks in Monterrey
Landforms of Nuevo León